The 2010 Grote Prijs Jef Scherens was the 44th edition of the Grote Prijs Jef Scherens cycle race and was held on 5 September 2010. The race started and finished in Leuven. The race was won by Lars Boom.

General classification

References

2010
2010 in road cycling
2010 in Belgian sport